Lionel Mark Smith (February 5, 1946 – February 13, 2008) was an American actor.

He appeared in several movies including Galaxina, Homicide, Edmond, State and Main, Spartan, and Treasure of Pirate's Point. He also appeared on such television series as Seinfeld, NYPD Blue, Beverly Hills, 90210 and Hill Street Blues.

His last appearance was in the 2007 horror film Stuck. He died from cancer in 2008, aged 62.

Filmography

External links

1946 births
2008 deaths
Male actors from Chicago
American male film actors
American male television actors
Deaths from cancer in California
20th-century American male actors